John Andrew Stoneham (November 8, 1908 – January 1, 2004) was an American professional baseball player. He played in Major League Baseball as an outfielder for the Chicago White Sox in 1933.

References

External links

1908 births
2004 deaths
Major League Baseball outfielders
Chicago White Sox players
Baseball players from Illinois
People from Wood River, Illinois
Washington University Bears baseball players
Dallas Rebels players
Fort Worth Cats players
Oklahoma City Indians players
McCook Generals players
Columbia Comers players
Wichita Aviators players
Mission Reds players
Tulsa Oilers (baseball) players